UAHS may refer to:
 Ulster Architectural Heritage Society
 Upper Arlington High School, a high school named for and located in the Columbus, Ohio, suburb of Upper Arlington
 Urrbrae Agricultural High School, Netherby, South Australia, Australia